The Monroe Township School District is a  comprehensive community public school district that serves students in kindergarten through twelfth grade from Monroe Township, in Middlesex County, New Jersey, United States.

As of the 2018–19 school year, the district, comprised of eight schools, had an enrollment of 6,829 students and 533.1 classroom teachers (on an FTE basis), for a student–teacher ratio of 12.8:1.

The district is classified by the New Jersey Department of Education as being in District Factor Group "FG", the fourth highest of eight groupings. District Factor Groups organize districts statewide to allow comparison by common socioeconomic characteristics of the local districts. From lowest socioeconomic status to highest, the categories are A, B, CD, DE, FG, GH, I and J.

Students from Jamesburg attend Monroe Township High School as part of a sending/receiving relationship with the Jamesburg Public Schools established in 1980.

Awards and recognition
During the 1991-92 academic school year, Mill Lake Elementary School received the National Blue Ribbon Award of Excellence from the United States Department of Education, the highest honor that an American school can achieve. This honor was followed during the 1998-99 academic school year at Barclay Brook Elementary School. Monroe Township could now boast that both their pre-K through third grade schools received the honor.

Curriculum
In 1996 the New Jersey Department of Education revised the elementary school core curriculum to require foreign language classes. In mid-October 1999 the district sent a questionnaire to 13,000 houses regarding what language should be taught to elementary students. The district received 458 back. 271 of those questionnaires chose Spanish, 96 of the returned questionnaires indicated a preference for Mandarin Chinese and the remaining 91 requested other languages that included Latin, Russian, and English itself. Stephen E. Derkoski, the assistant superintendent, stated that "We can't ignore" that the area houses had a preference of Spanish over Chinese on a 3 to 1 basis. In November 1999, the school board voted 7-1 to designate Spanish as the foreign language used in elementary schools.

Schools
Schools in the district (with 2018–19 enrollment data from the National Center for Education Statistics) are:
Elementary schools
Applegarth Elementary School with 439 students in grades 4-5
Dawn Graziano, Principal
Magdalena Fidura, Vice Principal
Barclay Brook Elementary School with 314 students in grades PreK-2
Erinn Mahoney, Principal
Brookside Elementary School with 400 students in grades 3-5
Antonio Pepe, Principal
Magdalena Fidura, Vice Principal
Mill Lake Elementary School with 544 students in grades PreK-2
Kristen Mignoli, Principal
Samantha McCloud, Vice Principal
Oak Tree Elementary School with 700 students in grades PreK-3
Patricia Dinsmore, Principal
Pamela Amendola, Vice Principal
Woodland Elementary School with 350 students in grades 3-5
Adam Layman, Principal
Samantha McCloud, Vice Principal
Middle school
Monroe Township Middle School with 1,702 students in grades 6-8
Chari Chanley, Principal
James Higgins, Vice Principal
William Jacoutot, Vice Principal
Scott Sidler, Vice Principal
High school
Monroe Township High School with 2,330 students in grades 9-12
Kevin Higgins, Principal
Giuseppe Calella, Vice Principal
James Cernansky, Vice Principal
Michael Collins, Vice Principal
Terri Weiss, Vice Principal

Administration
Core members of the district's administration are:
Chari Chanley, Superintendent
Laura Allen, Acting Business Administrator / Board Secretary

Board of education
The district's board of education, comprised of nine elected members, sets policy and oversees the fiscal and educational operation of the district through its administration. As a Type II school district, the board's trustees are elected directly by voters to serve three-year terms of office on a staggered basis, with three seats up for election each year held (since 2012) as part of the November general election; a tenth member is appointed by the Jamesburg district to represent its interests on the Monroe Township school board. The board appoints a superintendent to oversee the district's day-to-day operations and a business administrator to supervise the business functions of the district.

References

External links
Monroe Township School District
 
Data for the Monroe Township School District, National Center for Education Statistics

Jamesburg, New Jersey
Monroe Township, Middlesex County, New Jersey
New Jersey District Factor Group FG
School districts in Middlesex County, New Jersey